Timothy Fred Kennedy (born September 1, 1979) is a retired American mixed martial artist and current soldier. A professional from 2001 until 2016, he has fought in the UFC, Strikeforce, the WEC, ShoMMA, HDNet Fights, and represented the Chicago Red Bears in the IFL. Kennedy is one of the few fighters to simultaneously serve in the United States Army and fight professionally. He is also a television host, producer, and entrepreneur.

Background
Kennedy grew up the second son of three children in a Christian family in Atascadero, California. He is of Irish descent. As a youth, Kennedy's mother placed him in cooking and piano lessons. To offset her influence on him, Kennedy's father enrolled Tim and his brother in boxing lessons, wrestling teams, and Japanese ju-jitsu classes.

Military career
Tim Kennedy joined the Army on January 4, 2004, and completed Basic Combat Training, Advanced Individual Training, Airborne School, Special Forces Assessment and Selection and the Special Forces Qualification Course. Kennedy was featured in Dick Couch's book about Green Beret selection called Chosen Soldier under the moniker "Tom Kendall". In 2007, he completed Ranger School and was assigned to the 7th Special Forces Group, where he served on Operational Detachment Alpha. During this time he was also a sniper, sniper instructor, and the principal combatives instructor for C Company, 3rd Battalion, 7th Special Forces Group. Kennedy deployed in support of Operation Iraqi Freedom (OIF) and Operation Enduring Freedom (OEF) multiple times.

In August 2009, Kennedy transitioned from active duty to the Texas Army National Guard, joined 19th Special Forces Group and served in the position of Special Forces Weapons Sergeant, and has continued to serve with the Texas Army National Guard since then.

Among Kennedy's multiple awards are the Army's Bronze Star Medal.

On April 16, 2017, Kennedy announced his reenlistment into the U.S. Army Special Forces, praising the leadership of Secretary of Defense  James Mattis and National Security Adviser H.R. McMaster.

Mixed martial arts career

Early career
Kennedy began training at Dokan School of Martial Arts in Atascadero, California under Terry Kelly and Barry Smith. He first started fighting in 1996, amassing a record of 30–1 over the next five years. In 1999, Kennedy began training with Chuck Liddell, Jake Shields, Gan McGee, and John Hackleman at The Pit in San Luis Obispo. In 2003 he entered and won a one-night tournament at Extreme Challenge 50, winning all three of his fights. In 2004 he joined the Army. Kennedy only fought once in 2006. He then fought for the now defunct International Fight League in 2007, and did not fight in 2008 due to Army deployments overseas. During this time he wrote a three part series of "Letters from a Foreign Land" that chronicled his time in combat.

Strikeforce
Kennedy returned to mixed martial arts in 2009 with a win over Nick Thompson at Strikeforce Challengers: Villasenor vs. Cyborg in Kent, Washington. He followed this up with an impressive win over Zak Cummings in the main event of ShoMMA 3.

Kennedy fought Trevor Prangley on June 16, 2010, at Strikeforce: Los Angeles.  Kennedy won the fight via Submission (Rear-Naked Choke) in the first round.

Since his move to Austin, Texas, Tim has been training at Competitive Training Center and with BJJ black belt Phil Cardella at the Relson Gracie Jiu-Jitsu Austin Association.

Kennedy lost a 5-round decision to Ronaldo Souza for the vacant Strikeforce Middleweight Championship at Strikeforce: Houston on August 21, 2010. He was expected to face Jason Miller again on March 5, 2011, at Strikeforce 32. However, Miller was forced out of the bout with an injury and replaced by Melvin Manhoef. He won via submission in the first round. He returned in July 2011 to face Robbie Lawler at Strikeforce: Fedor vs. Henderson. He won the bout via unanimous decision. He faced Luke Rockhold on July 14, 2012, for the Strikeforce Middleweight championship at Strikeforce: Rockhold vs. Kennedy.  He lost the fight via unanimous decision.

Kennedy was expected to face Trevor Smith on November 3, 2012, at Strikeforce: Cormier vs. Mir. However, the event was cancelled due to injuries to headliner Frank Mir, as well to co-headliner and middleweight champion Luke Rockhold.  This bout eventually took place on January 12, 2013, at Strikeforce: Marquardt vs. Saffiedine. Kennedy won via submission in the third round.

Ultimate Fighting Championship
In January 2013, the Strikeforce organization was closed by its parent company Zuffa.  A list of fighters scheduled to be brought over to the Ultimate Fighting Championship was released in mid-January and Kennedy was one of the fighters listed.

Kennedy faced Roger Gracie on July 6, 2013, at UFC 162, he defeated Gracie via unanimous decision after defending Gracie's submission attempts and standing up with Gracie, out striking him.

Kennedy was expected to face Lyoto Machida on November 6, 2013, at UFC Fight For The Troops 3.  However, Machida was pulled from the bout in favor of a matchup with Mark Muñoz on October 26, 2013, at UFC Fight Night 30, after Muñoz's original opponent, Michael Bisping was forced out of their bout with an injury.  Kennedy instead faced Rafael Natal in the event headliner. He won the fight via knockout in the first round. The win also earned him his first Knockout of the Night bonus award.

For his third fight with the promotion, Kennedy faced Michael Bisping on April 16, 2014, at The Ultimate Fighter Nations Finale. He won the fight via unanimous decision.

Kennedy faced Yoel Romero on September 27, 2014, at UFC 178. He lost the fight via TKO in the third round.  Kennedy nearly finished Romero in the final seconds of the second round but Romero was saved by the bell. Yoel Romero, his cornermen, the referee and the UFC cutman have all been criticized for their actions resulting in a 28-second delay after the scheduled start for the third round. Romero later responded to the controversy, stating that Tim Kennedy illegally held his glove during the attack which prevented Romero from being able to block the punches that rocked him. Despite the loss, Kennedy earned a Fight of the Night bonus award.

After two years away from the sport, Kennedy was expected to face Rashad Evans on November 12, 2016, at UFC 205, the first UFC card at Madison Square Garden. However, on November 8, Evans was pulled from the fight after an undisclosed irregularity was found during his pre-fight medical exam. In turn, Kennedy was removed from the card as well. The bout was quickly rescheduled to take place a month later at UFC 206. Once again, Evans was unable to obtain medical clearance to compete on the card and was pulled from the bout on November 21. Kennedy faced Kelvin Gastelum. He lost the fight via TKO in the third round.

On January 17, 2017, Kennedy released a social media statement announcing his retirement from MMA. In the post he admitted that he no longer desired to fight professionally and thanked those closest to him for their support. He also thanked the US Army, claiming that there was 'no greater moment' than his victory in the main event of UFC: Fight for the Troops 3.

Personal life
Kennedy is married to Ginger Kennedy and they have three kids and reside in Texas. 

He is a co-owner of Ranger Up, a military-based clothing company. He's also the owner and “MF”CEO of Sheepdog Response a tactical training and self-defense company.

In 2020, Kennedy opened an Acton Academy, a K-12 charter school built off of the Acton School of Business model.

Film and television career
Kennedy's first major host role was part of the History Channel television series Hunting Hitler, which explores alternative theories about Adolf Hitler's death. He most recently hosted the show on Discovery Channel Hard to Kill, in which he attempted to explore a day in the life of the world's most dangerous occupations. He helped co-produce the TV documentary Warriors in 2014 and produced Not a War Story in 2017; he also produced and hosted Iron Dragon TV. He's made appearances on Deadliest Warrior and The Ultimate Soldier Challenge.

Kennedy portrayed himself in the Indie film Range 15. He also played Mario and was a producer in the short thriller Slaves. He's also done several military advisor roles & stunt coordinator positions notably with Range 15 as well as works on Steve-O: Guilty as Charged, and short film Next to You.

Military awards
Kennedy's awards include:

Championships and awards
Extreme Challenge
Extreme Challenge Middleweight Tournament winner
Ultimate Fighting Championship
Fight of the Night (One time)
Knockout of the Night (One time)

Mixed martial arts record

|-
|Loss
|align=center|18–6
|Kelvin Gastelum
|TKO (punches)
|UFC 206
|
|align=center|3
|align=center|2:45
|Toronto, Ontario, Canada
|
|-
| Loss
| align=center| 18–5
| Yoel Romero
| TKO (punches)
| UFC 178
| 
| align=center| 3
| align=center| 0:58
| Las Vegas, Nevada, United States
|
|-
| Win
| align=center| 18–4
| Michael Bisping
| Decision (unanimous)
| The Ultimate Fighter Nations Finale: Bisping vs. Kennedy
| 
| align=center| 5
| align=center| 5:00
| Quebec City, Quebec, Canada
|
|-
| Win
| align=center| 17–4
| Rafael Natal
| KO (punches)
| UFC: Fight for the Troops 3
| 
| align=center| 1
| align=center| 4:40
| Fort Campbell, Kentucky, United States
| 
|-
| Win
| align=center| 16–4
| Roger Gracie
| Decision (unanimous)
| UFC 162
| 
| align=center| 3
| align=center| 5:00
| Las Vegas, Nevada, United States
| 
|-
| Win
| align=center| 15–4
| Trevor Smith
| Submission (guillotine choke)
| Strikeforce: Marquardt vs. Saffiedine
| 
| align=center| 3
| align=center| 1:36
| Oklahoma City, Oklahoma, United States
| 
|-
| Loss
| align=center| 14–4
| Luke Rockhold
| Decision (unanimous)
| Strikeforce: Rockhold vs. Kennedy
| 
| align=center| 5
| align=center| 5:00
| Portland, Oregon, United States
| 
|-
| Win
| align=center| 14–3
| Robbie Lawler
| Decision (unanimous)
| Strikeforce: Fedor vs. Henderson
| 
| align=center| 3
| align=center| 5:00
| Hoffman Estates, Illinois, United States
| 
|-
| Win
| align=center| 13–3
| Melvin Manhoef
| Submission (rear-naked choke)
| Strikeforce: Feijao vs. Henderson
| 
| align=center| 1
| align=center| 3:41
| Columbus, Ohio, United States
| 
|-
| Loss
| align=center| 12–3
| Ronaldo Souza
| Decision (unanimous)
| Strikeforce: Houston
| 
| align=center| 5
| align=center| 5:00
| Houston, Texas, United States
| 
|-
| Win
| align=center| 12–2
| Trevor Prangley
| Submission (rear-naked choke)
| Strikeforce: Los Angeles
| 
| align=center| 1
| align=center| 3:35
| Los Angeles, California, United States
| 
|-
| Win
| align=center| 11–2
| Zak Cummings
| Submission (North-South choke)
| Strikeforce Challengers: Kennedy vs. Cummings
| 
| align=center| 2
| align=center| 2:43
| Bixby, Oklahoma, United States
| 
|-
| Win
| align=center| 10–2
| Nick Thompson
| TKO (submission to punches)
| Strikeforce Challengers: Villasenor vs. Cyborg
| 
| align=center| 2
| align=center| 2:37
| Kent, Washington, United States
| 
|-
| Win
| align=center| 9–2
| Elias Rivera
| KO (punches)
| IFL: World Grand Prix Finals
| 
| align=center| 1
| align=center| 2:00
| Uncasville, Connecticut, United States
| 
|-
| Loss
| align=center| 8–2
| Jason Miller
| Decision (unanimous)
| HDNetFIGHTS: Reckless Abandon
| 
| align=center| 3
| align=center| 5:00
| Dallas, Texas, United States
| 
|-
| Win
| align=center| 8–1
| Ryan McGivern
| Submission (guillotine choke)
| IFL: Chicago
| 
| align=center| 2
| align=center| 1:25
| Chicago, Illinois, United States
| 
|-
| Win
| align=center| 7–1
| Dante Rivera
| TKO (submission to punches)
| IFL: Atlanta
| 
| align=center| 2
| align=center| 2:29
| Atlanta, Georgia, United States
| 
|-
| Win
| align=center| 6–1
| Héctor Urbina
| KO (punches)
| Fight Fest 7
| 
| align=center| 1
| align=center| 1:28
| Cleveland, Ohio, United States
| 
|-
| Win
| align=center| 5–1
| Cruz Chacon
| TKO (punches)
| Extreme Challenge 50
| 
| align=center| 2
| align=center| 1:21
| Salt Lake City, Utah, United States
| 
|-
| Win
| align=center| 4–1
| Jason Miller
| Decision (unanimous)
| Extreme Challenge 50
| 
| align=center| 3
| align=center| 5:00
| Salt Lake City, Utah, United States
| 
|-
| Win
| align=center| 3–1
| Ryan Narte
| TKO (punches)
| Extreme Challenge 50
| 
| align=center| 1
| align=center| 1:22
| Salt Lake City, Utah, United States
|
|-
| Win
| align=center| 2–1
| Mack Brewer
| TKO (punches)
| WEC 5: Halloween Havoc
| 
| align=center| 1
| align=center| 1:03
| Lemoore, California, United States
| 
|-
| Win
| align=center| 1–1
| Jody Burke
| Submission (forearm choke)
| IFC: Warriors Challenge 16
| 
| align=center| 1
| align=center| 0:44
| Oroville, California, United States
|
|-
| Loss
| align=center| 0–1
| Scott Smith
| TKO (doctor stoppage)
| IFC: Warriors Challenge 15
| 
| align=center| 1
| align=center| 2:53
| Oroville, California, United States
|

Books published 
Kennedy, T., & Palmisciano, N. (2022). Scars and Stripes: An Unapologetically American Story of Fighting the Taliban, UFC Warriors, and Myself. Atria Books.

See also
 List of Strikeforce alumni
 List of male mixed martial artists

References

External links

 
 

1979 births
Living people
American people of Irish descent
People from San Luis Obispo, California
American male mixed martial artists
Columbia College (Missouri) alumni
American jujutsuka
Mixed martial artists utilizing jujutsu
Mixed martial artists utilizing Brazilian jiu-jitsu
Mixed martial artists from California
Middleweight mixed martial artists
Ultimate Fighting Championship male fighters
American practitioners of Brazilian jiu-jitsu
People awarded a black belt in Brazilian jiu-jitsu
American military snipers
Members of the United States Army Special Forces
United States Army personnel of the Iraq War
United States Army personnel of the War in Afghanistan (2001–2021)
Texas National Guard personnel
United States Army soldiers